The equation of time describes the discrepancy between two kinds of solar time. The word equation is used in the medieval sense of "reconcile a difference". The two times that differ are the apparent solar time, which directly tracks the diurnal motion of the Sun, and mean solar time, which tracks a theoretical mean Sun with uniform motion along the celestial equator. Apparent solar time can be obtained by measurement of the current position (hour angle) of the Sun, as indicated (with limited accuracy) by a sundial. Mean solar time, for the same place, would be the time indicated by a steady clock set so that over the year its differences from apparent solar time would have a mean of zero.

The equation of time is the east or west component of the analemma, a curve representing the angular offset of the Sun from its mean position on the celestial sphere as viewed from Earth. The equation of time values for each day of the year, compiled by astronomical observatories, were widely listed in almanacs and ephemerides.

The concept

During a year the equation of time varies as shown on the graph; its change from one year to the next is slight. Apparent time, and the sundial, can be ahead (fast) by as much as 16 min 33 s (around 3 November), or behind (slow) by as much as 14 min 6 s (around 11 February). The equation of time has zeros near 15 April, 13 June, 1 September, and 25 December. Ignoring very slow changes in the Earth's orbit and rotation, these events are repeated at the same times every tropical year. However, due to the non-integral number of days in a year, these dates can vary by a day or so from year to year.

The graph of the equation of time is closely approximated by the sum of two sine curves, one with a period of a year and one with a period of half a year. The curves reflect two astronomical effects, each causing a different non-uniformity in the apparent daily motion of the Sun relative to the stars:

 the obliquity of the ecliptic (the plane of the Earth's annual orbital motion around the Sun), which is inclined by about 23.44 degrees relative to the plane of the Earth's equator; and
 the eccentricity of the Earth's orbit around the Sun, which is about 0.0167.

The equation of time is constant only for a planet with zero axial tilt and zero orbital eccentricity. Two examples of planets with large equations of time are Mars and Uranus. On Mars the difference between sundial time and clock time can be as much as 50 minutes, due to the considerably greater eccentricity of its orbit. The planet Uranus, which has an extremely large axial tilt, has an equation of time that makes its days start and finish several hours earlier or later depending on where it is in its orbit.

Sign of the equation of time
The United States Naval Observatory states "the Equation of Time is the difference apparent solar time minus mean solar time", i.e. if the sun is ahead of the clock the sign is positive, and if the clock is ahead of the sun the sign is negative. The equation of time is shown in the upper graph above for a period of slightly more than a year. The lower graph (which covers exactly one calendar year) has the same absolute values but the sign is reversed as it shows how far the clock is ahead of the sun. Publications may use either format – in the English-speaking world, the former usage is the more common, but is not always followed. Anyone who makes use of a published table or graph should first check its sign usage. Often, there is a note or caption which explains it. Otherwise, the usage can be determined by knowing that, during the first three months of each year, the clock is ahead of the sundial. The mnemonic "NYSS" (pronounced "nice"), for "new year, sundial slow", can be useful. Some published tables avoid the ambiguity by not using signs, but by showing phrases such as "sundial fast" or "sundial slow" instead.

In this article, and others in English Wikipedia, a positive value of the equation of time implies that a sundial is ahead of a clock.

History
The phrase "equation of time" is derived from the medieval Latin aequātiō diērum, meaning "equation of days" or "difference of days". 
The word aequātiō (and Middle English equation) was  used in medieval astronomy to tabulate the difference between an observed value and the expected value (as in the equation of the centre, the equation of the equinoxes, the equation of the epicycle).  
Gerald J. Toomer uses the medieval term "equation" from the Latin aequātiō, for Ptolemy's difference between the mean solar time and the apparent solar time. Johannes Kepler's definition of the equation is "the difference between the number of degrees and minutes of the mean anomaly and the degrees and minutes of the corrected anomaly."

The difference between apparent solar time and mean time was recognized by astronomers since antiquity, but prior to the invention of accurate mechanical clocks in the mid-17th century, sundials were the only reliable timepieces, and apparent solar time was the generally accepted standard. Mean time did not supplant apparent time in national almanacs and ephemerides until the early 19th century.

Early astronomy
The irregular daily movement of the Sun was known to the Babylonians.

Book III of Ptolemy's Almagest (2nd century) is primarily concerned with the Sun's anomaly, and he tabulated the equation of time in his Handy Tables. Ptolemy discusses the correction needed to convert the meridian crossing of the Sun to mean solar time and takes into consideration the nonuniform motion of the Sun along the ecliptic and the meridian correction for the Sun's ecliptic longitude. However he did not consider the effect to be relevant for most calculations since it was negligible for the slow-moving luminaries and only applied it for the fastest-moving luminary, the Moon.

Based on Ptolemy's discussion in the Almagest, values for the equation of time  (Arabic taʿdīl al-ayyām bi layālayhā) were standard for the tables (zij) in the works of medieval Islamic astronomy.

Early modern period

A description of apparent and mean time was given by Nevil Maskelyne in the Nautical Almanac for 1767: "Apparent Time is that deduced immediately from the Sun, whether from the Observation of his passing the Meridian, or from his observed Rising or Setting.  This Time is different from that shewn by Clocks and Watches well regulated at Land, which is called equated or mean Time." He went on to say that, at sea, the apparent time found from observation of the Sun must be corrected by the equation of time, if the observer requires the mean time.

The right time was originally considered to be that which was shown by a sundial. When good mechanical clocks were introduced, they agreed with sundials only near four dates each year, so the equation of time was used to "correct" their readings to obtain sundial time. Some clocks, called equation clocks, included an internal mechanism to perform this "correction". Later, as clocks became the dominant good timepieces, uncorrected clock time, i.e., "mean time", became the accepted standard. The readings of sundials, when they were used, were then, and often still are, corrected with the equation of time, used in the reverse direction from previously, to obtain clock time. Many sundials, therefore, have tables or graphs of the equation of time engraved on them to allow the user to make this correction.

The equation of time was used historically to set clocks. Between the invention of accurate clocks in 1656 and the advent of commercial time distribution services around 1900, there were several common land-based ways to set clocks. A sundial was read and corrected with the table or graph of the equation of time. If a transit instrument was available, the sun's transit across the meridian (the moment the sun appears to be due south or north of the observer) was noted; the clock was then set to noon and offset by the number of minutes given by the equation of time for that date. A third method did not use the equation of time; instead, it used stellar observations to give sidereal time, exploiting the relationship between sidereal time and mean solar time.

The first tables to give the equation of time in an essentially correct way were published in 1665 by Christiaan Huygens. Huygens, following the tradition of Ptolemy and medieval astronomers in general, set his values for the equation of time so as to make all values positive throughout the year.

Another set of tables was published in 1672–73 by John Flamsteed, who later became the first Astronomer Royal of the new Royal Greenwich Observatory. These appear to have been the first essentially correct tables that gave today's meaning of Mean Time (previously, as noted above, the sign of the equation was always positive and it was set at zero when the apparent time of sunrise was earliest relative to the clock time of sunrise). Flamsteed adopted the convention of tabulating and naming the correction in the sense that it was to be applied to the apparent time to give mean time.

The equation of time, correctly based on the two major components of the Sun's irregularity of apparent motion, was not generally adopted until after Flamsteed's tables of 1672–73, published with the posthumous edition of the works of Jeremiah Horrocks.

Robert Hooke (1635–1703), who mathematically analyzed the universal joint, was the first to note that the geometry and mathematical description of the (non-secular) equation of time and the universal joint were identical, and proposed the use of a universal joint in the construction of a "mechanical sundial".

18th and early 19th centuries
The corrections in Flamsteed's tables of 1672–1673 and 1680 gave mean time computed essentially correctly and without need for further offset. But the numerical values in tables of the equation of time have somewhat changed since then, owing to three factors:
 general improvements in accuracy that came from refinements in astronomical measurement techniques,
 slow intrinsic changes in the equation of time, occurring as a result of small long-term changes in the Earth's obliquity and eccentricity (affecting, for instance, the distance and dates of perihelion), and
 the inclusion of small sources of additional variation in the apparent motion of the Sun, unknown in the 17th century, but discovered from the 18th century onwards, including the effects of the Moon, Venus and Jupiter.

From 1767 to 1833, the British Nautical Almanac and Astronomical Ephemeris tabulated the equation of time in the sense 'add or subtract (as directed) the number of minutes and seconds stated to or from the apparent time to obtain the mean time'.  Times in the Almanac were in apparent solar time, because time aboard ship was most often determined by observing the Sun. This operation would be performed in the unusual case that the mean solar time of an observation was needed. In the issues since 1834, all times have been in mean solar time, because by then the time aboard ship was increasingly often determined by marine chronometers. The instructions were consequently to add or subtract (as directed) the number of minutes stated to or from the mean time to obtain the apparent time. So now addition corresponded to the equation being positive and subtraction corresponded to it being negative.

As the apparent daily movement of the Sun is one revolution per day, that is 360° every 24 hours, and the Sun itself appears as a disc of about 0.5° in the sky, simple sundials can be read to a maximum accuracy of about one minute. Since the equation of time has a range of about 33 minutes, the difference between sundial time and clock time cannot be ignored. In addition to the equation of time, one also has to apply corrections due to one's distance from the local time zone meridian and summer time, if any.

The tiny increase of the mean solar day due to the slowing down of the Earth's rotation, by about 2 ms per day per century, which currently accumulates up to about 1 second every year, is not taken into account in traditional definitions of the equation of time, as it is imperceptible at the accuracy level of sundials.

Major components of the equation

Eccentricity of the Earth's orbit 

The Earth revolves around the Sun. As seen from Earth, the Sun appears to revolve once around the Earth through the background stars in one year. If the Earth orbited the Sun with a constant speed, in a circular orbit in a plane perpendicular to the Earth's axis, then the Sun would culminate every day at exactly the same time, and be a perfect time keeper (except for the very small effect of the slowing rotation of the Earth). But the orbit of the Earth is an ellipse not centered on the Sun, and its speed varies between 30.287 and 29.291 km/s, according to Kepler's laws of planetary motion, and its angular speed also varies, and thus the Sun appears to move faster (relative to the background stars) at perihelion (currently around 3 January) and slower at aphelion a half year later.

At these extreme points this effect varies the apparent solar day by 7.9 s/day from its mean. Consequently, the smaller daily differences on other days in speed are cumulative until these points, reflecting how the planet accelerates and decelerates compared to the mean. As a result, the eccentricity of the Earth's orbit contributes a periodic variation which is (in the first-order approximation) a sine wave with an amplitude of 7.66 min and a period of one year to the equation of time. The zero points are reached at perihelion (at the beginning of January) and aphelion (beginning of July); the extreme values are in early April (negative) and early October (positive).

Obliquity of the ecliptic 

Even if the Earth's orbit were circular, the perceived motion of the Sun along our celestial equator would still not be uniform. This is a consequence of the tilt of the Earth's rotational axis with respect to the plane of its orbit, or equivalently, the tilt of the ecliptic (the path the Sun appears to take in the celestial sphere) with respect to the celestial equator. The projection of this motion onto our celestial equator, along which "clock time" is measured, is a maximum at the solstices, when the yearly movement of the Sun is parallel to the equator (causing amplification of perceived speed) and yields mainly a change in right ascension. It is a minimum at the equinoxes, when the Sun's apparent motion is more sloped and yields more change in declination, leaving less for the component in right ascension, which is the only component that affects the duration of the solar day. A practical illustration of obliquity is that the daily shift of the shadow cast by the Sun in a sundial even on the equator is smaller close to the solstices and greater close to the equinoxes.  If this effect operated alone, then days would be up to 24 hours and 20.3 seconds long (measured solar noon to solar noon) near the solstices, and as much as 20.3 seconds shorter than 24 hours near the equinoxes.

In the figure on the right, we can see the monthly variation of the apparent slope of the plane of the ecliptic at solar midday as seen from Earth. This variation is due to the apparent precession of the rotating Earth through the year, as seen from the Sun at solar midday.

In terms of the equation of time, the inclination of the ecliptic results in the contribution of a sine wave variation with an amplitude of 9.87 minutes and a period of a half year to the equation of time. The zero points of this sine wave are reached at the equinoxes and solstices, while the extrema are at the beginning of February and August (negative) and the beginning of May and November (positive).

Secular effects
The two above mentioned factors have different wavelengths, amplitudes and phases, so their combined contribution is an irregular wave. At epoch 2000 these are the values (in minutes and seconds with UT dates):

E.T. = apparent − mean. Positive means: Sun runs fast and culminates earlier, or the sundial is ahead of mean time. A slight yearly variation occurs due to presence of leap years, resetting itself every 4 years. The exact shape of the equation of time curve and the associated analemma slowly change over the centuries, due to secular variations in both eccentricity and obliquity. At this moment both are slowly decreasing, but they increase and decrease over a timescale of hundreds of thousands of years.
On shorter timescales (thousands of years) the shifts in the dates of equinox and perihelion will be more important. The former is caused by precession, and shifts the equinox backwards compared to the stars. But it can be ignored in the current discussion as our Gregorian calendar is constructed in such a way as to keep the vernal equinox date at 20 March (at least at sufficient accuracy for our aim here). The shift of the perihelion is forwards, about 1.7 days every century. In 1246 the perihelion occurred on 22 December, the day of the solstice, so the two contributing waves had common zero points and the equation of time curve was symmetrical: in Astronomical Algorithms Meeus gives February and November extrema of 15 m 39 s and May and July ones of 4 m 58 s. Before then the February minimum was larger than the November maximum, and the May maximum larger than the July minimum. In fact, in years before −1900 (1901 BCE) the May maximum was larger than the November maximum. In the year −2000 (2001 BCE) the May maximum was +12 minutes and a couple seconds while the November maximum was just less than 10 minutes.  The secular change is evident when one compares a current graph of the equation of time (see below) with one from 2000 years ago, e.g., one constructed from the data of Ptolemy.

Graphical representation

Practical use
If the gnomon (the shadow-casting object) is not an edge but a point (e.g., a hole in a plate), the shadow (or spot of light) will trace out a curve during the course of a day. If the shadow is cast on a plane surface, this curve will be a conic section (usually a hyperbola), since the circle of the Sun's motion together with the gnomon point define a cone. At the spring and fall equinoxes, the cone degenerates into a plane and the hyperbola into a line. With a different hyperbola for each day, hour marks can be put on each hyperbola which include any necessary corrections. Unfortunately, each hyperbola corresponds to two different days, one in each half of the year, and these two days will require different corrections. A convenient compromise is to draw the line for the "mean time" and add a curve showing the exact position of the shadow points at noon during the course of the year. This curve will take the form of a figure eight and is known as an analemma. By comparing the analemma to the mean noon line, the amount of correction to be applied generally on that day can be determined.

The equation of time is used not only in connection with sundials and similar devices, but also for many applications of solar energy. Machines such as solar trackers and heliostats have to move in ways that are influenced by the equation of time.

Civil time is the local mean time for a meridian that often passes near the center of the time zone, and may possibly be further altered by daylight saving time. When the apparent solar time that corresponds to a given civil time is to be found, the difference in longitude between the site of interest and the time zone meridian, daylight saving time, and the equation of time must all be considered.

Calculating the equation of time
The equation of time is obtained from a published table, or a graph. For dates in the past such tables are produced from historical measurements, or by calculation; for future dates, of course, tables can only be calculated. In devices such as computer-controlled heliostats the computer is often programmed to calculate the equation of time. The calculation can be numerical or analytical. The former are based on numerical integration of the differential equations of motion, including all significant gravitational and relativistic effects. The results are accurate to better than 1 second and are the basis for modern almanac data. The latter are based on a solution that includes only the gravitational interaction between the Sun and Earth, simpler than but not as accurate as the former. Its accuracy can be improved by including small corrections.

The following discussion describes a reasonably accurate (agreeing with almanac data to within 3 seconds over a wide range of years) algorithm for the equation of time that is well known to astronomers. It also shows how to obtain a simple approximate formula (accurate to within 1 minute over a large time interval), that can be easily evaluated with a calculator and provides the simple explanation of the phenomenon that was used previously in this article.

Mathematical description
The precise definition of the equation of time is
 
The quantities occurring in this equation are
 EOT, the time difference between apparent solar time and mean solar time;
 GHA, the Greenwich Hour Angle of the apparent (actual) Sun;
 GMHA = Universal Time − Offset, the Greenwich Mean Hour Angle of the mean (fictitious) Sun.

Here time and angle are quantities that are related by factors such as: 2 radians = 360° = 1 day = 24 hours. The difference, EOT, is measurable since GHA is an angle that can be measured and Universal Time, UT, is a scale for the measurement of time. The offset by  = 180° = 12 hours from UT is needed because UT is zero at mean midnight while GMHA = 0 at mean noon. Both GHA and GMHA, like all physical angles, have a mathematical, but not a physical discontinuity at their respective (apparent and mean) noon. Despite the mathematical discontinuities of its components, EOT is defined as a continuous function by adding (or subtracting) 24 hours in the small time interval between the discontinuities in GHA and GMHA.

According to the definitions of the angles on the celestial sphere  (see hour angle) where:
 GAST is the Greenwich apparent sidereal time (the angle between the apparent vernal equinox and the meridian in the plane of the equator).  This is a known function of UT.
  is the right ascension of the apparent Sun (the angle between the apparent vernal equinox and the actual Sun in the plane of the equator).

On substituting into the equation of time, it is
 
Like the formula for GHA above, one can write , where the last term is the right ascension of the mean Sun. The equation is often written in these terms as
 
where . Both  and  vary from 0 to 24 hours during the course of a year. The former has a discontinuity at a time that depends on the value of UT, while the latter has its at a slightly later time. As a consequence, when calculated this way EOT has two, artificial, discontinuities. The resulting EOT is a continuous function of time.

Another definition, denoted  to distinguish it from EOT, is
 
Here , is the Greenwich mean sidereal time (the angle between the mean vernal equinox and the mean Sun in the plane of the equator). Since the amplitude of the nutational motion is only about 1.2 s (18″ of longitude) the difference between EOT and  can be ignored unless one is interested in subsecond accuracy.

 
here  is the ecliptic longitude of the mean Sun (the angle from the mean vernal equinox to the mean Sun in the plane of the ecliptic).

The difference  is 1.3 s from 1960 to 2040. Therefore, over this restricted range of years  is an approximation to EOT whose error is in the range 0.1 to 2.5 s depending on the longitude correction in the equation of the equinoxes; for many purposes, for example correcting a sundial, this accuracy is more than good enough.

Right ascension calculation
The right ascension, and hence the equation of time, can be calculated from Newton's two-body theory of celestial motion, in which the bodies (Earth and Sun) describe elliptical orbits about their common mass center. Using this theory, the equation of time becomes
 
where the new angles that appear are
  =  days is the length of time in an anomalistic year: the time interval between two successive passages of the periapsis;
 , is the ecliptic longitude of the periapsis;
  is dynamical time, the independent variable in the theory.

To complete the calculation three additional angles are required:
 , the Sun's eccentric anomaly (note that this is different from );
 , the Sun's true anomaly;
 , the Sun's true longitude on the ecliptic.

All these angles are shown in the figure on the right, which shows the celestial sphere and the  Sun's elliptical orbit seen from the Earth (the same as the Earth's orbit seen from the Sun). In this figure  is the obliquity, while  is the eccentricity of the ellipse.

First, given , calculate  from Kepler's equation:
 

Although this equation cannot be solved exactly in closed form, values of  can be obtained from infinite (power or trigonometric) series, graphical, or numerical methods.
 
This approximation can be improved, for small , by iterating again,
 ,

Next, knowing , calculate the true anomaly  from an elliptical orbit relation

Thus for  use , and for  use . Here  is the principal branch, ; the function that is returned by calculators and computer applications.
 .
For small  this approximation (or even just the first two terms) is a good one.
 .

Next, knowing , calculate  from its definition:
 
The value of  varies non-linearly with  because the orbit is elliptical and not circular. From the approximation for :
 .

Finally, knowing  calculate  from a relation for the right triangle on the celestial sphere shown above
 
 ,
where  is 0 if  is in quadrant 1, it is 1 if  is in quadrants 2 or 3 and it is 2 if  is in quadrant 4. For the values at which tan is infinite, .

 
where .
 .

Equation of time
The equation of time is obtained by substituting the result of the right ascension calculation into an equation of time formula. Here  is used; in part because small corrections (of the order of 1 second), that would justify using , are not included, and in part because the goal is to obtain a simple analytical expression.
  minutes
The numerical values written here result from using the orbital parameter values,  = ,  = ° =  radians, and  = ° =  radians that correspond to the epoch 1 January 2000 at 12 noon UT1. Higher order approximations can also be written, but they necessarily have more terms. For example, the second order approximation in both  and  consists of five terms
 
This creates additional calculational complications.

  days  days 
At periapsis , so solving gives  = . This puts the periapsis on 4 January 2000 at 00:11:41 while the actual periapsis is, according to results from the Multiyear Interactive Computer Almanac (abbreviated as MICA), on 3 January 2000 at 05:17:30. This large discrepancy happens because the difference between the orbital radius at the two locations is only 1 part in a million; in other words, radius is a very weak function of time near periapsis. As a practical matter this means that one cannot get a highly accurate result for the equation of time by using  and adding the actual periapsis date for a given year.

When , M is greater than 2 and one must subtract a multiple of 2 (that depends on the year) from it to bring it into the range 0 to 2. Likewise for years prior to 2000 one must add multiples of 2.

Remark on the continuity of the equation of time
For the choice of the appropriate branch of the  relation with respect to function continuity a modified version of the arctangent function is helpful. It brings in previous knowledge about the expected value by a parameter. The modified arctangent function is defined as:
 .
The function  rounds to the nearest integer.

Applying this yields:
 .
The parameter  arranges here to set  to the zero nearest value which is the desired one.

Secular effects
The difference between the MICA and  results was checked every 5 years over the range from 1960 to 2040. In every instance the maximum absolute error was less than 3 s; the largest difference, 2.91 s, occurred on 22 May 1965 (day 141). However, in order to achieve this level of accuracy over this range of years it is necessary to account for the secular change in the orbital parameters with time. The equations that describe this variation are:

According to these relations, in 100 years ( = ),  increases by about 0.5% (1.7°),  decreases by about 0.25%, and  decreases by about 0.05%.

As a result, the number of calculations required for any of the higher-order approximations of the equation of time requires a computer to complete them, if one wants to achieve their inherent accuracy over a wide range of time. In this event it is no more difficult to evaluate  using a computer than any of its approximations.

In all this note that  as written above is easy to evaluate, even with a calculator, is accurate enough (better than 1 minute over the 80-year range) for correcting sundials, and has the nice physical explanation as the sum of two terms, one due to obliquity and the other to eccentricity that was used previously in the article.

Alternative calculation
Another procedure for calculating the equation of time can be done as follows. Angles are in degrees; the conventional order of operations applies.
 = 
where  is the Earth's mean angular orbital velocity in degrees per day, a.k.a. "the mean daily motion".

 
where  is the date, counted in days starting at 1 on 1 January (i.e. the days part of the ordinal date in the year). 9 is the approximate number of days from the December solstice to 31 December.  is the angle the Earth would move on its orbit at its average speed from the December solstice to date .

 
 is the angle the Earth moves from the solstice to date , including a first-order correction for the Earth's orbital eccentricity, 0.0167 . The number 3 is the approximate number of days from 31 December to the current date of the Earth's perihelion. This expression for  can be simplified by combining constants to: 
 .

 

Here,  is the difference between the angle moved at mean speed, and at the angle at the corrected speed projected onto the equatorial plane, and divided by 180° to get the difference in "half-turns". The value 23.44° is the tilt of the Earth's axis ("obliquity"). The subtraction gives the conventional sign to the equation of time. The value generated by a calculator or computer may not be the appropriate one for this calculation. This may cause  to be wrong by an integer number of half-turns. The excess half-turns are removed in the next step of the calculation to give the equation of time:

  minutes

Its value is 0, 1, or 2 at different times of the year. Subtracting it leaves a small positive or negative fractional number of half turns, which is multiplied by 720, the number of minutes (12 hours) that the Earth takes to rotate one half turn relative to the Sun, to get the equation of time.

Compared with published values, this calculation has a root mean square error of only 3.7 s. The greatest error is 6.0 s. This is much more accurate than the approximation described above, but not as accurate as the elaborate calculation.

Addendum about solar declination

 

which is accurate to within a fraction of a degree.

See also 
Azimuth
Milankovitch cycles

Notes and footnotes
Notes

Footnotes

References

External links

NOAA Solar Calculator
USNO data services  (include rise/set/transit times of the Sun and other celestial objects)
The equation of time described on the Royal Greenwich Observatory web site
The Equation of Time and the Analemma, by Kieron Taylor
An article by Brian Tung containing a link to a C program using a more accurate formula than most (particularly at high inclinations and eccentricities). The program can calculate solar declination, Equation of Time, or Analemma.
Doing calculations using Ptolemy's geocentric planetary models with a discussion of his E.T. graph
Equation of Time Longcase Clock by John Topping C.1720
The equation of time correction-table A page describing how to correct a clock to a sundial.
Solar tempometer – Calculate your solar time, including the equation of time.

Dynamics of the Solar System
Timekeeping
Time in astronomy
Earth phenomena
Sundials
Equations